De Wet Kruger (born 18 November 1991) is a South African professional rugby union player for  in the Currie Cup and in the Rugby Challenge. His regular position is number eight or flanker.

Career

Western Province

After high school, Kruger joined the Western Province Rugby Institute for the 2010 season and made three starts for  during the 2010 Under-19 Provincial Championship. He featured during the regular season of the competition to help Western Province finish top of the log. They eventually won the competition, beating the s 26–20 in the final in Durban.

Free State Cheetahs / UFS Shimlas

Kruger moved to Bloemfontein for the 2011 season. He was included in the  squad for the 2011 Under-21 Provincial Championship, but failed to feature in any matches.

Kruger did play for the Under-21 side in the 2012 edition, however, making three appearances during the regular season as his side finished in fourth spot to claim the final semi-final berth. Kruger scored a try on the hour mark in their semi-final – just three minutes after coming on as a replacement – but it wasn't enough as eventual champions  won the match 31–24.

Personal life

Kruger is the older brother of centre Tertius Kruger.

References

South African rugby union players
Living people
1991 births
People from Randfontein
Rugby union centres
Free State Cheetahs players
Sportspeople from Gauteng